Robson Jorge & Lincoln Olivetti is the sole collaborative album by Brazilian MPB musicians Robson Jorge and Lincoln Olivetti.

Background 

Jorge and Olivetti were frequent collaborators, both prolific instrumentalists, arrangers, and producers who have worked with MPB musicians Tim Maia, Rita Lee, Roberto Carlos, Sandra de Sá, Marcos Valle, and Jorge Ben Jor. Robson Jorge & Lincoln Olivetti was Jorge and Olivetti's only studio album credited to the duo, but in 2021, an unreleased second collaborative album was rumored to exist.

Legacy 

Robson Jorge & Lincoln Olivetti has been hailed as a classic of MPB, defining the sound of the genre and influencing the likes of Tim Maia. The album became one of the rarest and most valuable vinyls in Brazil, coveted by record collectors. It is considered an international reference of MPB and has been played and remixed by DJs throughout the world.

Decades after its release, the album has been praised by music critics for its melodic hooks, bright and funky horn arrangements, scat vocals, and boogie grooves.

Track listing

References

External links 
 

1982 albums
Som Livre albums